Marsilac is one of 96 districts of São Paulo, located in the extreme south tip of the city in the subprefecture of Parelheiros. Its name is a tribute to engineer Jose Alfredo Marsilac, who developed many techniques for building roads and tunnels, even after losing 99% of his vision from being hit by a bomb in the Revolution of 1932.

History 
Early settlement of the area owed mainly to the construction of the Mairinque–Santos by Estrada de Ferro Sorocabana connecting Mairinque and Santos, completed in 1935. Along its extension, there were three stations in the district: Engineer Marsilac (which gave name to the surrounding neighborhood and later to its own district), Evangelista de Souza, and Rio de Campos.

Features 
Located near the Serra do Mar and almost entirely rural, Marsilac has the largest land area of the municipality, equivalent to all of the municipality's central area. It also has the lowest population density of all the districts, largely covered by reserves of the Atlantic Forest.

This is the most remote district of the capital, located about 60–70 kilometers from Marco Zero and only about 10–15 km from the Atlantic Ocean, which is visible from some points. It borders the municipalities of São Vicente and Itanhaém. A tiny area of the town lies at sea level, located in the Capivari River valley.

It is the poorest district and has the lowest Human Development Index (HDI) of the city of São Paulo.

Adjacent districts and municipalities 
 Parelheiros (North)
 Municipality of São Bernardo do Campo (East)
 City of Itanhaém and São Vicente (South)
 City of Juquitiba and Embu-Guaçu (West)

Neighborhoods of Marsilac 

 Banhado
 Bela Vista
 Capivari
 Cipó do Meio
 Chácara Sanni
 Embura
 Parque Florestal Paulista
 Chácara Galo Azul 
 Parque Internacional
 Chácara Itajaá
 Mambu
 Engenheiro Marsilac
 Evangelista de Sousa
 Gramado
 Jardim dos Eucaliptos
 Paiol
 Ponte Alta

See also
 Roman Catholic Diocese of Santo Amaro
 Line 9 (CPTM) of Train
 Railway Line Santos-Jundiaí
 Colônia crater
 Guarapiranga reservoir
 Parelheiros-Itanhaém Highway 57

References

External links
 Roman Catholic Diocese of Santo Amaro
 Parelheiros News
 Sheet of My Sampa
 Grajaú News

Districts of São Paulo